Arthur P. Paterson (born 31 January 1996) is a professional footballer who currently plays as a midfielder for Charleston Battery in the USL Championship. Born in the United States, he represents the Grenada national team.

Career

College
Paterson spent his entire college career at Wright State University.  He made a total of 76 appearances for the Raiders and tallied 15 goals and 7 assists. During his senior year at Wright State, he was named; USC First Team All-Great Lakes Region, Horizon League Player for the Year, First Team All-Horizon League, and OCSA First Team All-State.

While at college, Paterson played for Premier Development League side SW Florida Adrenaline during their 2016 season.

Professional
On January 19, 2018, Paterson was selected 42nd overall in the 2018 MLS SuperDraft by the New York City FC. However, he was not signed by the club.

On February 19, 2018, he signed with USL club Bethlehem Steel FC. He made his professional debut on March 24, 2018, starting in a 2-0 loss against Tampa Bay Rowdies.

Bethlehem Steel released Paterson at the end of the 2018 season.

Paterson joined USL Championship side Charleston Battery on March 8, 2019.

International
In October 2018, Paterson received his first international call-up to the Grenada national team ahead of the CONCACAF Nations League qualification match against Cuba. Paterson is eligible to play for Grenada via his father. Paterson made his debut for Grenada in a 1-0 CONCACAF Nations League loss to Cuba national football team on 12 October 2018.

International goals
Scores and results list Grenada's goal tally first.

References

External links
Wright State bio

Bethlehem Steel bio

1996 births
Living people
People with acquired Grenadian citizenship
Grenadian footballers
Grenada international footballers
American soccer players
American people of Grenadian descent
Association football midfielders
Philadelphia Union II players
Charleston Battery players
New York City FC draft picks
People from Key Largo, Florida
Soccer players from Florida
SW Florida Adrenaline players
USL Championship players
USL League Two players
Wright State Raiders men's soccer players
2021 CONCACAF Gold Cup players